The Story of My Life is an album released by Gangsta Pat 1997.

Track listing 
 No Sympathy - 4:02
 Sittin on tha Porch - 4:31
 Droppin' Bombs - 2:51
 Mind on My Money - 4:30
 Mad World - 4:17
 The Story of My Life - 4:42
 I Wanna Smoke, Pt. 3 - 4:22
 Bloody Murder - 4:07
 Back & Forth - 4:06
 Keep It Real - 4:14
 Untouchable - 4:31
 G's Aint Suppose to Cry - 5:08
 Death B-4 Dishonesty - 4:28
 God Is Real - 4:30
 Real Niggas Toat Glocks - 4:31

1997 albums
Gangsta Pat albums